Stephen Moss may refer to:

 Stephen Moss, British natural historian, birder, author and television producer
 Sir Stephen Moss (nurse) (born 1947), British nurse
 Steve Moss (1948–2005), American editor and publisher 
 Stephen Moss (American author), American writer and professor
 Stephen P. Moss (1840–1917), American rancher, businessman and state legislator
 Steve Moss (musician), American multi-instrumentalist
 Steve Moss (politician) (born 1950), American politician